Chester Yorton (1940 – November 21, 2020) also known as Chet Yorton, was an American bodybuilder who became known as "The Father of Natural Bodybuilding" for his advocacy of steroid-free bodybuilding. He defeated Arnold Schwarzenegger at the 1966 NABBA Mr. Universe (amateur) held in London.

Early life

Yorton was born in 1940. While not athletic during his youth, Yorton was in a life-threatening auto accident in high school. He sustained several severe cuts and shattered bones in his pelvis, legs, and elbow. One of his legs was to be amputated but doctors were able to save it with a metal plate. His doctors agreed he could rehabilitate himself with light weight training from his wheelchair.

Personal life
Yorton married his wife Vicki in 1972. They had one child together, their daughter Shannon.

On December 4, 2020, Shannon revealed on her social media both of her parents had died two weeks prior. She wrote her father had discovered her mother dead from unknown causes, and he died from a heart attack a few days later. Vicki was 78; Yorton was 81.

Notes

External links
 
 Bodybuilding.com profile
 The Yorton Cup

1940 births
American bodybuilders
2020 deaths
People associated with physical culture